Dreaming of the Masters Suite: Music Inspired by and Dedicated to John Coltrane is an album by the Art Ensemble of Chicago released on the Japanese DIW label. It features performances by Lester Bowie, Joseph Jarman, Roscoe Mitchell, Malachi Favors Maghostut and Don Moye.

Reception
The Allmusic review by Brian Olewnick states "The Coltrane songs are played competently but without either the ecstatic abandon of their creator, or with the investigatory intelligence and wit of the  Art Ensemble at its peak... The remaining compositions walk a similarly safe line; they're pleasant enough and well-played but don't have the bite or passion that admirers of this superb ensemble had come to expect".

Track listing
 "Dreaming of the Masters" (Jarman) 1:04
 "Call of the Captain" (Art Ensemble of Chicago) - 2:20
 "Impressions" (Coltrane) - 6:47
 "Colors Too" (Art Ensemble of Chicago) - 6:13
 "Naima" (Coltrane) 5:37
 "Spiritual" (Coltrane) - 2:46
 "Ohnedaruth" (Art Ensemble of Chicago) - 7:02
 "Go Ahead" (Art Ensemble of Chicago) - 7:37
 "Song for Atala" (Mitchell) - 6:56
 "Dreaming of the Masters" (Jarman) - 0:48
Recorded on January 12 & 14 and March 11, 17, 18, 21 & 24, 1990 at Systems Two Studios, Brooklyn, New York.

Personnel
Lester Bowie – trumpet, flugelhorn
Malachi Favors Maghostut – bass, percussion
Joseph Jarman – saxophones, clarinets, percussion
Roscoe Mitchell – saxophones, clarinets, flute, percussion
Don Moye – Sun percussion

References

1991 albums
DIW Records albums
Art Ensemble of Chicago albums